Brave Heart is a 1983 album by Thom Schuyler. It was his first album after signing a solo deal with Capitol Records and produced two top 30 singles.

Track listing

References

1983 albums
Thom Schuyler albums
Capitol Records albums
Albums produced by David Malloy